Shiro Tsujimura (born 1947 in Gossei, Japan) is a Japanese contemporary ceramic artist.
New York Times commends his work with the following words: "For a look at some of the most expressive abstract painting around, check out the new ceramics by the Japanese artist Shiro Tsujimura at Koichi Yanagi. Mr. Tsujimura, who was born in 1947 and trained in a Zen temple before becoming a potter, is self-taught, prolific and wide open to all kinds of traditional styles and forms, which he makes entirely his own".

References

Books

Shiro Tsujimura. Ceramic works. New York : Yoshii Gallery, 2009.

External links
https://axel-vervoordt.s3.amazonaws.com/documents/TSUJIMURA_BIO-website.pdf?mtime=20190419094640
Shiro Tsujimura at yoshiigallery.com
Tsujimura Shirō - Artists - Joan B Mirviss LTD | Japanese Fine Art | Japanese Ceramics

Japanese ceramists
1942 births
Living people